Ektor Tsironikos (Arachova, Iraia, Arkadia, 1882 – 1964) was a Greek businessman and a collaborationist minister in certain German-appointed Greek governments during the Axis occupation of Greece.

References 

Greek collaborators with Nazi Germany
Greek businesspeople
Agriculture ministers of Greece
Economy ministers of Greece
Finance ministers of Greece
People from Iraia
1882 births
1964 deaths